Aliens: Dark Descent is an upcoming real-time strategy video game developed by Tindalos Interactive in collaboration with Disney's 20th Century Games and published by Focus Entertainment. Set in the Alien franchise, the game is set to be released for PlayStation 4, PlayStation 5, Windows, Xbox One and Xbox Series X and Series S in 2023.

Gameplay
Dark Descent is a real-time strategy video game played from a top-down perspective. Players need to issue commands to a squad of four colonial marines, who must battle the Xenomorphs and rogue agents from the Weyland-Yutani Corporation. The game features five starting character classes, each with their own unique weapons and abilities. While combat happens in real time, players can briefly slow time to a crawl in order to issue commands or set up an ambush. Players are encouraged to explore the moon station, discovering short cuts and deploying motion trackers which allows players to track alien movements. They can also use electrical saw to open locked doors, or welded door shut as they retreat from one room to another. The changes to level layout are permament. Welding a door may stop the Xenomorphs from advancing, but it may also block the player's route in subsequent visits.

Between missions, players can upgrade and customize their characters. Players need to maintain not only the physical health but also the mental health of these characters. Each character has their own mental traits. Their combat performance may be affected if they were put under too much strain. They may miss their shots, behave irrationally, or even sabotage the player's mission. Squad members may die permamently after being attacked. Players can evacuate during a mission to prevent losing the entire squad. According to the developer, each mission in the game lasts "anywhere between 20 minutes and an hour".

Story
Set 20 years after the events of Alien 3, a team of colonial marines must stop a Xenomorph outbreak while gathering resources to repair their Otago spacecraft in the moon base of Lethe.

Development
The game is currently being developed by French studio Tindalos Interactive, which had previously developed the Battlefleet Gothic: Armada series of real-time strategy video game. According to managing director John Bert, the game was inspired by both tactical and computer role-playing game. The game was announced during Summer Game Fest in June 2022. It is set to be released for PlayStation 4, PlayStation 5, Windows, Xbox One and Xbox Series X and Series S in 2023.

References

External links
 

Upcoming video games scheduled for 2023
Focus Entertainment games
Real-time strategy video games
Video games set in outer space
Alien (franchise) games
Video games developed in France
Windows games
PlayStation 4 games
PlayStation 5 games
Xbox One games
Xbox Series X and Series S games
Permadeath games
Tindalos Interactive games